Dulce amor is a Colombian telenovela produced by Unai Amushastegui for Caracol Televisión. It is based on the soap opera of the same name produced in Argentina by Enrique Estevanez.

Plot 
Lack of money, the loss of supporters, and household debts that must be paid force Martin Guerrero to give up his race car driving to become executive Natalia Toledo's chauffeur.  In spite of the endless list of the "doctora's" demands,  Martin's bad habit of breaking the rules, and the many differences between the two, Natalia and Martin discover that they make a perfect couple.  The Toledo women are united by a love of racing and four generations of falling in love with the wrong man.  Together with the residents of a popular barrio, they will find the happiness they were seeking as they unite to achieve the same goal: the return of Martin and Julián to the races.

Cast 
Andrés Sandoval as Martín Guerrero
Marianela González as Natalia Toledo
Juan Manuel Mendoza as Julián
Juan Pablo Barragán as Gonzalo
Abril Schretber as Juliana Toledo
Camila Zarate as Veronica Toledo
José Julián Gaviria as Lucas
Miguel González as Ciro
Alberto Barrero as Agustín
Kristina Lilley as Helena Toledo
Jean Philippe Conan as Freddy
Arnold Cantillo as Álvarez
Yaneth Waldman as Emilia Toledo
Valentina Lizcano as Amanda
Jimmy Vásquez as Lorenzo
Freddy Ordóñez as Terco
Marta Liliana Ruiz as Isabel
Astrid Junguito as Rosa
Álex Gil as Adrián
Juan Esteban Aponte as «Betico» López
Ella Becerra as Gabriela
Natalia Reyes as Florencia «Flor» Guerrero
Paola Díaz as Alicia
Liliana Castrillón as Noelia Fernández

References

External links
 Official website

Colombian telenovelas
Spanish-language telenovelas
Caracol Televisión telenovelas
2015 Colombian television series debuts
2016 Colombian television series endings
Television shows set in Bogotá